Tipnaree Weerawatnodom (also known as Namtan (Sugar), born 1 July 1996) is a Thai actress and host. She is known for her main roles as Boom in GMMTV's Friend Zone (2018) and Friend Zone 2: Dangerous Area (2020), and as both Meen and Mind in Who Are You (2020).

Early life and education 
Born in Phra Nakhon Si Ayutthaya Province, Thailand as Narumon Weerawatnodom, she completed her secondary education at Chomsurang Upatham School. In 2018, she graduated with a bachelor's degree in fine arts, major in acting and directing from the Faculty of Fine Arts at Srinakharinwirot University.

Career 
She went on to play main and support roles in several television series such as U-Prince Series (2016–2017), Slam Dance (2017), My Dear Loser (2017), Friend Zone (2018) and Love Beyond Frontier.

She recently played the role of Meen and Mind in Who Are You (2020) and reprised her role as Boom in Friend Zone 2: Dangerous Area (2020). She will be playing the role of Pon in the upcoming television series, Romantic Blue: The Series.

Filmography

Television

Awards and nominations

Personal life 
Tipnaree is the younger sister of professional footballer Narubadin Weerawatnodom.

References

External links 
 
 

1996 births
Living people
Tipnaree Weerawatnodom
Tipnaree Weerawatnodom
Tipnaree Weerawatnodom
Tipnaree Weerawatnodom
Tipnaree Weerawatnodom